The 2020 Taini Jamison Trophy Series, also known as the 2020 Cadbury Netball Series saw England play New Zealand in October and November 2020 in a three-match series. It was the first international netball test series to be staged since the onset of the COVID-19 pandemic. The two teams contested the Taini Jamison Trophy, which was last staged in 2018. The trophy was won by New Zealand, who defeated England in all three matches.

Squads

Matches

First test

Second test

Third test

See also
Taini Jamison

References

External links
 Silver Ferns
 England Netball

2020
2020 in New Zealand netball
2020 in English netball
International netball competitions hosted by New Zealand
New Zealand national netball team series
England national netball team series
October 2020 sports events in New Zealand
November 2020 sports events in New Zealand